Le weekend may refer to:

Weekend (1967 film), French film
Le Week-End, 2013 British film